Christian Schweizer (born 6 January 1995) is a Guamanian international footballer.

Career
Schweizer started his soccer career with seven years in the Robbie Webber Youth Soccer League for the Crushers Football Club of Hagåtña, Guam. In 2007 joined the youth team of the Wings Soccer Club, who played until 2009. In 2009 attended the St. John's School (Guam) and played besides for the Tamuning based youth soccer club Wings SC.

Schweizer started his Senior career in 2011 in the Guam Men's Soccer League for Fuji-Ichiban Espada FC.

International
He made his first appearance for the Guam national football team in 2011.

References

1995 births
Guamanian footballers
Living people
Guam international footballers
Association football defenders